Olukemi Omololu-Olunloyo (born 6 August 1964) is a Nigerian journalist, blogger, and activist against gun violence, and a social media personality. She is well known within the Nigerian online community, especially for making highly disputed and controversial claims about subjects with high emotional stakes, such as the End SARS protests in 2020 and the death of a private school student from Lagos.

Background
Omololu-Olunloyo is the daughter of former Oyo State governor Victor Omololu Olunloyo and the second of ten children. She lived for 14 years in Nigeria, 20 years in the United States, and five years in Canada before returning to Nigeria.

Career
Omololu-Olunloyo has appeared as a guest discussing terrorism and health topics on CBC News, Ruptly, CTV News, BBC and Nigerian Television Authority. She also worked briefly as a music journalist with the Nigerian Tribune

Community and social activism
While in Canada, Omololu-Olunloyo was active against gun violence. In 2014 she released the names and photographs of men who solicited sex or exposed themselves on social media.

In 2014, she was among the top three nominees of the Social Media Awards Africa's Social Media Influencer of the Year.

Deportation from Canada

In August 2012, Omololu-Olunloyo was arrested in her apartment in Toronto by agents from the Canada Border Services Agency. After being determined a flight risk when her refugee visa was not renewed, she was remanded into custody at the Vanier Centre for Women for seven days before she was deported to Nigeria.

See also
List of Nigerian bloggers

References

External links

1964 births
Living people
Nigerian journalists
Writers from Ibadan
Yoruba women journalists
Nigerian expatriates in Canada
People deported from Canada
Nigerian women activists
Yoruba women activists
Yoruba women writers
Crime victim advocates
Nigerian women bloggers
Nigerian bloggers
Nigerian expatriates in the United States
Social media influencers